This is a list of molecules that have been detected in the interstellar medium and circumstellar envelopes, grouped by the number of component atoms. The chemical formula is listed for each detected compound, along with any ionized form that has also been observed.

Background
The molecules listed below were detected through astronomical spectroscopy. Their spectral features arise because molecules either absorb or emit a photon of light when they transition between two molecular energy levels. The energy (and thus the wavelength) of the photon matches the energy difference between the levels involved. Molecular electronic transitions occur when one of the molecule's electrons moves between molecular orbitals, producing a spectral line in the ultraviolet, optical or near-infrared parts of the electromagnetic spectrum. Alternatively, a vibrational transition transfers quanta of energy to (or from) vibrations of molecular bonds, producing signatures in the mid- or far-infrared. Gas-phase molecules also have quantised rotational levels, leading to transitions at microwave or radio wavelengths.

Sometimes a transition can involve more than one of these types of energy level e.g. ro-vibrational spectroscopy changes both the rotational and vibrational energy level. Occasionally all three occur together, as in the Phillips band of C2 (diatomic carbon), in which an electronic transition produces a line in the near-infrared, which is then split into several vibronic bands by a simultaneous change in vibrational level, which in turn are split again into rotational branches.

The spectrum of a particular molecule is governed by the selection rules of quantum chemistry and by its molecular symmetry. Some molecules have simple spectra which are easy to identify, whilst others (even some small molecules) have extremely complex spectra with flux spread among many different lines, making them far harder to detect. Interactions between the atomic nuclei and the electrons sometimes cause further hyperfine structure of the spectral lines. If the molecule exists in multiple isotopologues (versions containing different atomic isotopes), the spectrum is further complicated by isotope shifts.

Detection of a new interstellar or circumstellar molecule requires identifying a suitable astronomical object where it is likely to be present, then observing it with a telescope equipped with a spectrograph working at the required wavelength, spectral resolution and sensitivity. The first molecule detected in the interstellar medium was the methylidyne radical (CH•) in 1937, through its strong electronic transition at 4300 angstroms (in the optical). Advances in astronomical instrumentation have led to increasing numbers of new detections. From the 1950s onwards, radio astronomy began to dominate new detections, with sub-mm astronomy also becoming important from the 1990s.

The inventory of detected molecules is highly biased towards certain types which are easier to detect: e.g. radio astronomy is most sensitive to small linear molecules with a high molecular dipole. The most common molecule in the Universe, H2 (molecular hydrogen) is completely invisible to radio telescopes because it has no dipole; its electronic transitions are too energetic for optical telescopes, so detection of H2 required ultraviolet observations with a sounding rocket. Vibrational lines are often not specific to an individual molecule, allowing only the general class to be identified. For example, the vibrational lines of polycyclic aromatic hydrocarbons (PAHs) were identified in 1984, showing the class of molecules is very common in space, but it took until 2021 to identify any specific PAHs through their rotational lines.

One of the richest sources for detecting interstellar molecules is Sagittarius B2 (Sgr B2), a giant molecular cloud near the centre of the Milky Way. About half of the molecules listed below were first found in Sgr B2, and many of the others have been subsequently detected there. A rich source of circumstellar molecules is CW Leonis (also known as IRC +10216), a nearby carbon star, where about 50 molecules have been identified. There is no clear boundary between interstellar and circumstellar media, so both are included in the tables below.

The discipline of astrochemistry includes understanding how these molecules form and explaining their abundances. The extremely low density of the interstellar medium is not conducive to the formation of molecules, making conventional gas-phase reactions between neutral species (atoms or molecules) inefficient. Many regions also have very low temperatures (typically 10 kelvin inside a molecular cloud), further reducing the reaction rates, or high ultraviolet radiation fields, which destroy molecules through photochemistry. Explaining the observed abundances of interstellar molecules requires calculating the balance between formation and destruction rates using gas-phase ion chemistry (often driven by cosmic rays), surface chemistry on cosmic dust, radiative transfer including interstellar extinction, and sophisticated reaction networks.

Molecules
The following tables list molecules that have been detected in the interstellar medium or circumstellar matter, grouped by the number of component atoms. Neutral molecules and their molecular ions are listed in separate columns; if there is no entry in the molecule column, only the ionized form has been detected. Designations (names of molecules) are those used in the scientific literature describing the detection; if none was given that field is left empty. Mass is listed in atomic mass units. Deuterated molecules, which contain at least one deuterium (2H) atom, have slightly different masses and are listed in a separate table. The total number of unique species, including distinct ionization states, is indicated in each section header.

Most of the molecules detected so far are organic. The only detected inorganic molecule with five or more atoms is SiH4. Molecules larger than that all have at least one carbon atom, with no N−N or O−O bonds.

Diatomic (43)

Triatomic (44)

Four atoms (30)

Five atoms (20)

Six atoms (16)

Seven atoms (13)

Eight atoms (14)

Nine atoms (10)

Ten or more atoms (21)

Deuterated molecules (22)
These molecules all contain one or more deuterium atoms, a heavier isotope of hydrogen.

Unconfirmed (13)
Evidence for the existence of the following molecules has been reported in the scientific literature, but the detections either are described as tentative by the authors, or have been challenged by other researchers. They await independent confirmation.

See also

 Astrochemistry
 Cosmic dust
 Diffuse interstellar band
 Lists of molecules
 Molecular astrophysics
 Molecular spectroscopy
 Molecules in stars
 Polycyclic aromatic hydrocarbon (PAH)
 Tholin

References

Notes

External links
 
 
 
 
 

Astrochemistry
Molecules in interstellar space
Interstellar media
Molecules